The 1995 Houston Oilers season was the 36th season overall and 26th with the National Football League (NFL). Their 7–9 record bested their previous season's output of 2–14, but they failed to qualify for the playoffs for the second consecutive year.

The Oilers drafted quarterback Steve McNair with the third overall draft pick, but he started the season on the bench behind free agent signee Chris Chandler, who played solid football as the team showed improved in their first full year under Jeff Fisher. The story of the season came on November 16 when owner Bud Adams announced plans to move the team to Nashville when the lease at the Astrodome expired in 1998. The Oilers were the debut opponent of the expansion Jacksonville Jaguars, just as they had been with the 1976 Tampa Bay Buccaneers in the NFL's previous expansion.

Offseason

NFL draft

Personnel

Staff

Roster

Regular season

Schedule

Standings

References

External links
 1995 Houston Oilers at Pro-Football-Reference.com

Houston Oilers seasons
Houston Oilers
Houston